Nabis punctatus is a species of damsel bug in the family Nabidae.

References

Nabidae